Belmond Mount Nelson Hotel is a luxury hotel at the centre of Cape Town in a garden estate overlooked by Table Mountain.

Chronology

Further reading
Orient Express – A personal Journey by James Sherwood 
Mount Nelson – by James Sherwood

References

External links 
 
Belmond.com
 

Belmond hotels
Hotels established in 1899
Economy of Cape Town
Hotels in South Africa